Koivisto is a Finnish surname. Notable people with the surname include:

 Anu Koivisto, Finnish backstroke swimmer
 Henrik Koivisto (born 1990), Finnish ice hockey player
 Mauno Koivisto (1923–2017), Finnish president
 Rami Koivisto (born 1968), Finnish ice hockey player
 Tellervo Koivisto (née Kankaanranta, born 1929), Finnish politician and the former First Lady of Finland
 Tellervo M. Koivisto (née Heino, 1927–1982), Finnish teacher and politician
 Tom Koivisto, Finnish ice hockey player
 Toni Koivisto, Finnish ice hockey player
 Markku Koivisto, Finnish revival evangelist, doctor of theology

Finnish-language surnames